The Critics' Choice Movie Award for Best Actor in a Comedy is one of the awards given to people working in the motion picture industry by the Broadcast Film Critics Association (BFCA) at their annual Critics' Choice Movie Awards.

Winners and nominees

2010s

Multiple nominees

2 nominations
 Steve Carell
 Viggo Mortensen
 Ryan Reynolds
 Channing Tatum

3 nominations
 Christian Bale

Multiple winners
2 wins
 Christian Bale

References 

A
Film awards for lead actor